Breña is a district, Lima, Peru. Breña or Brena may also refer to:
Brena (surname)
"Breña", a song by A Perfect Circle from Mer de Noms
Breña Alta, a municipality in the province of Santa Cruz de Tenerife, in the Canary Islands
Breña Baja, a municipality in the province of Santa Cruz de Tenerife, in the Canary Islands
Las Breñas, a city in Chaco Province, Argentina
House at Breñas Point, a house on a peninsula named Breñas, in Dorado, Puerto Rico
Brena (footballer) (born 1996), Brazilian footballer